Halbturn is a town in the district of Neusiedl am See in the Austrian state of Burgenland. It borders Hungary to the east and is near Andau, Gols, and Mönchof.

History
In 2008 a team of archeologists discovered a third-century AD amulet in the form of a gold scroll with the words of the Jewish prayer Shema' Yisrael (Hear, O Israel! The Lord is our God, the Lord is one) inscribed on it. It is considered to be the earliest surviving evidence of a Jewish presence in what is now Austria.

Halbturn Palace was built between 1701 and 1711 by Johann Lukas von Hildebrandt as a hunting lodge for Charles VI, Holy Roman Emperor. His daughter, Empress Maria Theresa, had it enlarged and gave it to her daughter Maria Christina, Duchess of Teschen. In 1955 it was inherited by Baron Paul Waldbott von Bassenheim, a Habsburg matrilineal descendant. In 2008 it passed to his nephew, Count Markus von Königsegg-Aulendorf.

Population

References 

Cities and towns in Neusiedl am See District
Baroque architecture in Austria
Historic Jewish communities